Stanimir Gospodinov (Bulgarian: Станимир Господинов; born 3 March 1975) is a Bulgarian former professional footballer who played as a defender.

Career
Gospodinov started his career in his hometown Sliven. At 21 years old he went into the Bulgarian grand Levski Sofia. For two years in Levski he played in 43 caps and scored 1 goal.

He then played for CSKA Sofia, Slavia Sofia, Slovenian NK Mura, Vihren Sandanski and Daugava Daugavpils.

In January 2009 Gospodinov returned to Bulgaria, signing a contract with Minyor Pernik. Some six months later he transferred to Lokomotiv Mezdra.

References

External links
Player Profile at Soccerway
Player Profile at levskisofia.info

1975 births
Living people
Bulgarian footballers
PFC Levski Sofia players
PFC CSKA Sofia players
PFC Slavia Sofia players
NK Mura players
FC Daugava players
OFC Vihren Sandanski players
PFC Minyor Pernik players
PFC Lokomotiv Mezdra players
FC Botev Krivodol players
Expatriate footballers in Slovenia
Expatriate footballers in Latvia
First Professional Football League (Bulgaria) players

Association football defenders
Sportspeople from Sliven